The 2002 European Weightlifting Championships were held in Antalya, Turkey. It was the 81st edition of the event.

Medal overview

Men

Women

References
Results (sports123)

European Weightlifting Championships
Weightlifting
Sport in Antalya
21st century in Antalya
European 2002
2002 in weightlifting